The Magic Shoes is a 1935 Australian short film based on the fairy tale Cinderella. It features the first screen performance by Peter Finch and Helen Hughes, daughter of former Prime Minister William Hughes and was the first dramatised movie to be shot at the National Studios, built to make The Flying Doctor (1936).

Today The Magic Shoes is considered a lost film. However 33 production and publicity stills relating to the film were discovered in 2006.

Premise
A "pantomine fantasy".

Cast
Peter Finch as Prince Charming
Gloria Gotch
Helen Hughes
Norman French
Sheilah Parry as the fairy princess
Andrew Higginson as the policeman
Phil Smith
Peter Dawson as the equerry
Bertie Wright as the jester
George Hurt
Carleton Stuart

Production
It was the first production from Pacific Productions. This was a new company capitalised at £10,000 headed by George Wirth, a wealthy circus personality, which wanted to focus on making shorts.

The crew included future war photographer Damien Parer and among the cast were Phil Smith, father of actor Mona Barrie; Peter Dawson, a New Zealand comedian, dancer and eccentric dancer; Helen Hughes, daughter of Billy Hughe; Peter Finch; and a number of children who were students at an acting school run by director Claude Flemming with Frank Harvey.

Filming finished by November 1935. It was originally scheduled for 11 days and finished in eight.

Editing was completed the following month.

Reception
The film failed to find a distributor and was not a financial success.

See also
List of lost films

References

External links
The Magic Shoes at National Film and Sound Archive – includes copies of stills
Images from film

1935 films
Lost Australian films
Australian drama short films
1935 drama films
Films based on Charles Perrault's Cinderella
Films based on Cinderella
Australian black-and-white films
1935 lost films
Lost drama films
1935 short films
Films directed by Claude Flemming
1930s English-language films